Fiddler's Green is a place in legend.  

Fiddler's Green may also refer to:

Music
 Fiddler's Green, an album by Tim O'Brien
 Fiddler's Green (band), a German band playing Irish independent speedfolk music
 "Fiddler's Green", a song by Canadian rock band The Tragically Hip from the album Road Apples
 "Fiddler on the Green", a heavy metal song by Demons and Wizards

Fiction
 Fiddler's Green (character) is a fictional character from Neil Gaiman's series The Sandman
 Fiddler's Green, a building for privileged people in a human settlements in George A. Romero's 2005 film Land of the Dead
 Land of the Dead: Road to Fiddler's Green, a 2005 video game
 Fiddler's Green is a colony world in the Robert Heinlein novel Friday, and mentioned in The Cat Who Walks Through Walls

Geography
 Fiddler's Green, Herefordshire, England
 Fiddler's Green, Norfolk, England
 Fiddler's Green Amphitheatre, Colorado, United States
 Firebase Fiddler's Green, in Helmand Province, Afghanistan
 Fiddler's Green, Cheltenham, Gloucestershire, England

Literature
Fiddler's Green, Ernest K. Gann 1950 novel turned into the 1951 Hollywood film The Raging Tide

Fiddlers Green Farm, Mashonaland West, Karoi, Zimbabwe.